The 1924 Princeton Tigers football team represented Princeton University in the 1924 college football season. The team finished with a 4–2–1 record under 11th-year head coach Bill Roper. No Princeton players were consensus honorees on the 1924 College Football All-America Team, but two  players received first-team honors from at least one selector. They are: end Edmond Stout (Football World and All-Sports Magazine magazines), and tackle Bob Beattie (NEA, Billy Evans and Walter Eckersall),

Schedule

References

Princeton
Princeton Tigers football seasons
Princeton Tigers football